The 2007–08 Segunda Divisão season was the 74th season of the competition and the 58th season of recognised third-tier football in Portugal.

Overview
The league was contested by 55 teams in 4 divisions with GD Ribeirão, UD Oliveirense, SC Covilhã and CD Olivais e Moscavide winning the respective divisional competitions and progressing to the championship playoffs.  The overall championship was won by UD Oliveirense and the runners-up SC Covilhã were also promoted to the Liga de Honra.

League standings

Série A

Série A Promotion Group

Série A Relegation Group 1

Série A Relegation Group 2

Série B

Série B Promotion Group

Série B Relegation Group 1

Série B Relegation Group 2

Série C

Série C Promotion Group

Série C Relegation Group 1

Série C Relegation Group 2

Série D

Série D Promotion Group

Série D Relegation Group 1

Série D Relegation Group 2

Championship Playoffs

Semi-finals

Final
The final was played on 22 June 2008 in Pombal.

Footnotes

External links
 Portuguese Division Two «B» – footballzz.co.uk

Portuguese Second Division seasons
Port
3